Copa Pachuca 99 was the first edition of the Copa Pachuca in Mexico. Club Deportivo Guadalajara managed to snag the first Copa Pachuca championship in their only participation in the tournament up to date. This tournament set a tradition for C.F. Pachuca that would soon be recognized as La Cuna de Futbol.

Teams Participating

Bracket

Third place - 9 January - Estadio Hidalgo 
 C.F. Pachuca - 0  Pumas U.N.A.M. - 2

Champion

References
 

Copa Pachuca
1999–2000 in Mexican football